We Can't Go Wrong is the second album from the New York-based R&B–dance trio The Cover Girls. Although the album only made it to #108 on the Billboard album chart, by the end of 1990 it had been certified platinum and become the group's biggest-selling album. We Can't Go Wrong features songwriting and production by Albert Cabrera, Andy "Panda" Tripoli, David Cole, "Little" Louie Vega, Robert Clivilles, and Tony Moran.

After scoring moderate success with their debut album Show Me in 1987, the group left independent label Fever Records, and signed with Capitol Records for this album, which was released in August 1989. This album contains the same mixture of fine Freestyle dance numbers and soaring R&B-styled ballads as their debut album. Besides the three hit singles released from this album ("My Heart Skips a Beat", "We Can't Go Wrong", and "All That Glitters Isn't Gold"), standout tracks include "Nothing Could Be Better", "That Boy of Mine" (which was also featured on their debut album Show Me), "No One in This World", and a cover version of the Carole King–Gerry Goffin classic "Up on the Roof". This album would be the last one to feature lead singer Angel Clivillés (who would depart the group for a solo career) and Margo Urban who would both be replaced by Evelyn Escalera and Michelle Valentine respectively.

Track listing

Track information and credits verified from the album's liner notes.

Charts
Album - Billboard (United States)

Singles - Billboard (United States)

We Can't Go Wrong (single)

References

1989 albums
The Cover Girls albums
Capitol Records albums